Doming Ngok-pui Lam (5 August 1926 – 11 January 2023) was a music composer born in Macau. He was named as "the father of Hong Kong modern music" for his contribution to the music industry of Hong Kong.

Background 
Lam studied music in Toronto (The Royal Conservatory of Music 1954-1958) and Los Angeles (University of Southern California 1960-1963). He travelled extensively around the world to international conferences, seminars, workshops, festivals and Rostrums, in order to maintain his sensitivity and knowledge in the music world.

From 1964 to 1994, he served actively in Hong Kong as a composer, conductor, lecturer, journalist, protector of performing rights, promoter of music exchanges in both Asia and around the globe.

His objective in writing music was to create modern Chinese music by applying avantgarde technique on traditional roots. His thoughts influenced many of his contemporaries and young composers.

Lam died on 11 January 2023, at the age of 96.

Honours and awards 
In the 1999 Culture Day, Lam was named one of the five Asian composing masters by the music circle in Tokyo. Lam is the first Macau-born composer to be included in the prestigious Grove Dictionary of Music and Musicians. Lam was named Honourary Member of the International Society for Contemporary Music (ISCM) at its World Music Days in Hong Kong in 2007.

References

External Links
 

1926 births
2023 deaths
20th-century classical composers
Macau people
Hong Kong composers
Academic staff of the University of Hong Kong
RTHK